Mambaram is a small town situated on the shores of Anjarakkandy river in Thalassery taluk, Kannur district, Kerala state, South India.

Famous education institutes like Indiragandhi College of Science & Technology, Mambaram Higher Secondary School, Mambaram English Medium School, Indira Gandhi Public School etc. are situated in this small town.  It lies around 22 km from Kannur and 10 km from Thalassery.

The place is famous for the Arathil Bhagavathi Temple, a highly revered shrine dedicated to Goddess Bhagavathi.  The annual Thira festival is celebrated in this temple and attracts thousands of devotees.

Transport
Mambaram is easily accessible by local buses from Kannur and Thalassery. Kozhikode is about 77 km away.  The nearest bus station is at Kuthuparamba.  Thalassery Railway Station serves this area.  kannur Airport is the nearest airport. Mattannur {new airport} is 20 km from this town. The Peralassery A.K.G's native place is 3 km from this town. Pinarayi:Parapram is ~3–5 km from this town.
 After the opening of Kannur airport in December 2018, the nearest airport now is Kannur airport which is about 17 km.

Education

Mambaram Higher Secondary School (MHSS) and Mambaram English Medium School (MEMS) promoted by Mr. Mambaram P. Madhavan are located 10 km from Thalassery and 20 km from Kannur.

Indiragandhi College of Science and Technology (IIST) and Indira Gandhi Public School are promoted by Mr. Mambaram Divakaran.

Mambaram Higher Secondary School was founded in 1983.  Principal Mr. C. V Thilakaraj of MHSS won the President of India's medal for honorary services in 2005.  The school celebrated its Silver Jubilee year.  Winner of many district, state and national awards for arts, cultural & science competitions this school has transformed itself from its modest beginnings to a well renowned name in school education in Kerala state now. It was state"s best school in kerala sastrolsavam for many years.

On 9 January 2008 Kerala State Governor, R.L. Bhatia inaugurated the Silver Jubilee celebrations. Kannur MP Mr. A. P. Abdullakutty, MLA Mr. K. C. Venugopal, District Collector Ms. Ishita Roy etc. presided over the function.

Mambaram English Medium School (CBSE) was founded in 1991 and is located on the Kuthuparamba Road.  This is the first CBSE affiliated school in the area and also the largestMr.R.K.Krishnan Nambiar famous educationalist, was the founderprincipal ..

Indira Gandhi Public School Situated in Thalassery road, this is another good school situated in Mambaram Town.  There is also a very well maintained students park in shore of the Mambaram River &  beneath to the Indira Gandhi Public School.

Mambaram UP School

Other Establishments
BSNL office
Post office
Syndicate Bank
District co op bank
Kuthuparamb co op bank mambaram branch
Pathiriyad co op bank mambaram branch
North Malabar Gramin bank
dafodils kinder garden
Mambaram Children's Park
Mambaram Juma Masjid
Mambaram Darul irshad Secondary madrassa
South Indian Bank

See also
 Kannavam
 Pinarayi
 Mavilayi
 Thrippangottur
 Mattanur
 Kannur
 Iritty
 Mangattidam
 Pathiriyad
 Manantheri
 Cheruvanchery

References

External links

 Mambaram English Medium School (CBSE)
 Mambaram Higher Secondary School (SSLC)
 
 
 

Villages near Kannur airport